Jorgina Lulú Guillermo Díaz, known professionally as Yailin La Más Viral, is a Dominican rapper and singer. Guillermo was born on 4 July 2002 in Santo Domingo.

Career 
Yailin is a Dominican dembow artist. She signed with Akino Mundial Music in 2019. In August 2020, she released "Quien Me Atraca A Mí (remix)" featuring Haraca Kiko under Gatty Music. In December 2020, she released "Yo No Me Voy Acostar" with Tokischa and La Perversa. She quickly gained popularity on TikTok in 2021 after releasing the hit song "Chivirika" with El Villano RD. In April 2022, Yailin commenced her first concert tour in the United States.

On 1 April 2022, Anuel AA and Yailin released their single "Si Tú Me Busca". The song was produced by Súbelo Neo. 

In October 2022, Yailin collaborated with la Insuperable and Farina in "Soy Mamá" (remix). 

In late 2022, it was confirmed that Yailin appears on Anuel AA's album LLNM2 in the songs "La Máquina" and "Del Kilo".

Personal life 
Guillermo and Puerto Rican rapper Anuel AA publicly confirmed their relationship  via a social media post in January 2022. Later in June 2022, the couple got married. In February 2023, the couple announced their separation. In March 2023, her first daughter named Cattleya was born.

References

External links 
 

Living people
21st-century Dominican Republic women singers
Mixed-race Dominicans
Reggaeton musicians
2002 births